Father and Son or Fathers and Sons may refer to:

Literature 
Father and Son (book), a 1907 memoir by Edmund Gosse
Father and Son (comics), cartoon characters created by E. O. Plauen
Fathers and Sons (novel), an 1862 novel by Ivan Turgenev
Fathers and Sons (play), a 1987 play by Brian Friel
"Fathers and Sons" (short story), a 1933 short story by Ernest Hemingway
Father and Son, a 1996 novel by Larry Brown

Music 
"Father and Son" (song), a 1970 song by Cat Stevens
Fathers and Sons (album), a 1969 album by Muddy Waters
"Father and Son", a 1975 song by Gino Vannelli from Storm at Sunup
"Father and Son", a 1996 song from Aladdin and the King of Thieves

Film
Father and Son (1929 American film), an American film
Father and Son (1929 German film), a German silent film
Father and Son (1930 film), a German-Swedish film
Father and Son (1934 film), a British crime film
Father and Son (1981 film), Hong Kong film
Fathers & Sons (1992 film), an American film
Fathers & Sons (2010 film), a Canadian comedy-drama film
Fathers and Sons (1957 film), an Italian comedy film
Fathers and Sons (1958 film), a Soviet drama film
Father and Son (1994 film), an Italian film
Father and Son (2003 film), a Russian film
Father and Son (2017 Vietnamese film), a film by Lương Đình Dũng
Father and Son (2017 Chinese film), a film by Yuan Weidong

Television
Father & Son (TV serial), a British/Irish television serial
Fathers and Sons (1986 TV series), an American sitcom
Fathers and Sons (2007 TV series), a Hong Kong television drama
"Fathers and Sons" (Frasier), an episode of Frasier
"Fathers and Sons" (Justified), an episode of Justified
Fathers and Sons (The Outer Limits), an episode of The Outer Limits
Fathers and Sons (2005 film), an American television movie starring Reiko Aylesworth

Other uses
Father and Son (Bourgeois), an 2005 fountain and sculpture by Louise Bourgeois

See also 
 "Fathers and Suns", an episode of Red Dwarf
 Like Father Like Son (disambiguation)
 Of Fathers and Sons, a 2017 documentary film
 Vader & Zoon, a comic strip by Peter van Straaten